Alice Panato (born 19 October 1999) is an Italian female canoeist who won two medals at senior level at the Wildwater Canoeing World Championships.

Her father is the canoeing legend Vladi Panato, also her sister Cecilia is a canoeist, he is also their coach

Medals at the World Championships
Senior

References

External links
 

1999 births
Living people
Italian female canoeists
Sportspeople from Verona